James Leland Sims (1905-1977) was a provincial politician from Alberta, Canada. He served as a member of the Legislative Assembly of Alberta from 1955 to 1959 sitting with the Liberal caucus in opposition.

Political career
Sims ran for a seat to the Alberta Legislature in the 1955 Alberta general election as a Liberal party candidate in the electoral district of Acadia-Coronation. The race was hotly contested with Sims defeating Social Credit incumbent Clarence Gerhart on the second ballot. Sims finished a close second on the first count but was able to surpass Gerhart on second choice votes from Cooperative Commonwealth candidate L.E. Reiman.

Sims ran for a second term in the 1959 Alberta general election. He was defeated finishing a distant second place in the field of three candidates losing to Social Credit candidate Marion Kelts.

Sims attempted to regain his seat in 1963 Alberta general election. He ran in the new electoral district of Sedgewick-Coronation. Sims was defeated again finishing in second place losing to incumbent Jack Hillman in a landslide.

References

External links
Legislative Assembly of Alberta Members Listing

Alberta Liberal Party MLAs
1905 births
1977 deaths